Paul Opsommer is a Republican former member of the Michigan House of Representatives, representing an area directly north of Lansing from 2007 through 2012. Prior to his election to the House, Opsommer was the mayor and a member of the DeWitt City Council.

Opsommer was the vice president of Action Management Corporation in Flint and is active with many local governmental agencies and boards. He also served on the Clinton County Conservation Board for 12 years.

References

1952 births
Living people
Republican Party members of the Michigan House of Representatives
Mayors of places in Michigan
Michigan city council members
People from DeWitt, Michigan
Michigan State University alumni
21st-century American politicians